Barbora Krejčíková defeated Iga Świątek in the final, 6–4, 6–2 to win the women's singles tennis title at the 2023 Dubai Tennis Championships. It was her first WTA 1000 title. In addition to world No. 1 Świątek, Krejčíková also defeated No. 2 Aryna Sabalenka and No. 3 Jessica Pegula, becoming the fifth woman to defeat the top three ranked players in a single tournament, and the third to do so outside of the WTA Finals. Krejčíková also saved four match points en route to the title, in the second round against Daria Kasatkina.

Jeļena Ostapenko was the defending champion, but lost in the third round to Sabalenka.

Seeds 
The top eight seeds received a bye into the second round. 

 Iga Świątek (final)
 Aryna Sabalenka (quarterfinals)
 Jessica Pegula (semifinals)
 Caroline Garcia (second round)
 Coco Gauff (semifinals)
 Maria Sakkari (second round)
 Daria Kasatkina (second round)
 Belinda Bencic (third round)

 Elena Rybakina (third round, withdrew)
 Veronika Kudermetova (first round)
 Beatriz Haddad Maia (first round)
 Petra Kvitová (third round)
 Jeļena Ostapenko (third round)
 Liudmila Samsonova (third round)
 Victoria Azarenka (third round)
 Ekaterina Alexandrova (withdrew)

Draw

Finals

Top half

Section 1

Section 2

Bottom half

Section 3

Section 4

Qualifying

Seeds

Qualifiers

Lucky losers

Qualifying draw

First qualifier

Second qualifier

Third qualifier

Fourth qualifier

Fifth qualifier

Sixth qualifier

Seventh qualifier

Eighth qualifier

References

External links 

Main draw
Qualifying draw

2023 WTA Tour
Singles women